Karczmiska  is a village in the administrative district of Gmina Ryki, within Ryki County, Lublin Voivodeship, in eastern Poland.

The village has a population of 640.

References

Karczmiska